Ana Miranda is a Brazilian poet and novelist born in Fortaleza, Ceará in 1951. She grew up in Brasilia and has lived in Rio de Janeiro since 1969.  Her main work of note has been historical, including her award-winning 1989 novel A Boca do Inferno, which was published in English in 1991. Many of her other works have concerned the conflicts of women wanting to have careers and families.

Film adaptions
The film Desmundo by Alain Fresnot is an adaption of her novel of the same name.

External links
Hope College

References

1951 births
Living people
Brazilian women novelists
20th-century Brazilian novelists
20th-century Brazilian women writers
21st-century Brazilian novelists
21st-century Brazilian women writers